Terence Michael Joseph "Geezer" Butler (born 17 July 1949) is an English musician and songwriter. He is best known as the bassist and primary lyricist of the heavy metal band Black Sabbath. He has also recorded and performed with Heaven & Hell, GZR, and Ozzy Osbourne. Butler was the bassist of Deadland Ritual, which has since disbanded.

Early life
Geezer Butler as he is known by, adopted the nickname "Geezer" at an early age. "It came because when I was at school, my brother was in the army, and he was based with a lot of Cockneys. And people in London call everybody a 'geezer.' [It means] just a man — like, 'Hello, mate.' It's just like somebody calling you 'dude' over here (in the United States). In England, it'd be 'geezer.' So my brother used to come home from leave from the army, and he'd be going, 'Hello, geezer. How are you, geezer?' So because I had looked up to my brother when I was about seven years old, I'd go to school calling everybody a geezer. So that's how I got cursed with it."

Butler grew up in a working-class Irish Catholic family in Birmingham. The Butler family had seven children and were poor, typically having "no money whatsoever". Two of Butler's older brothers had been called upon to serve in the army and Butler feared that he would be next. However, mandatory service was ended in England a couple of years before he was due to be conscripted.

Butler was heavily influenced by the writing of Aleister Crowley as a teenager. By his late teens, he had stopped attending Mass. He cited a loss of belief, and feels that everyone should sooner or later decide for themselves what to believe in. By the end, Butler was "going to Mass every Sunday just to take a look at all the nice girls that were going there", he recalled years later.

Career 

Butler formed his first band, Rare Breed, in late 1967, with John "Ozzy" Osbourne soon joining as lead vocalist. At that time, Butler was dating a girl who lived near Tony Iommi, and Iommi's earliest memories of Butler involved seeing him walking past his house every day to visit her. Later, Iommi and Butler became acquainted when their bands played at a nearby nightclub. Separated for a time, Osbourne and Butler reunited in the blues foursome, Polka Tulk, along with guitarist Iommi and drummer Bill Ward, both of whom had recently left the band Mythology. They renamed their new band Earth, but a band already existed in the small-time English circuit with the same name, so they were forced to change the name yet again. Inspired by the popular Boris Karloff horror film of the same name, Butler suggested the name Black Sabbath in early 1969.

Inspired by John Lennon, Butler played rhythm guitar in his pre-Sabbath days, including with Rare Breed. When Sabbath was formed, Iommi made it clear that he did not want to play with another guitarist, so Butler moved to bass. According to Butler, "I'd never played bass until I was on stage at the first gig that we played. Borrowed the bass guitar off one of my friends and it only had three strings on it." Butler lists Jack Bruce of Cream as his biggest influence as a bassist. Iommi described Butler as being "from another planet" in the band's early days; he took LSD, wore Indian hippie dresses, and was very peaceful. At the time Black Sabbath was formed, Butler was studying to become an accountant, and this training resulted in him managing the band's finances in the early days.

After Black Sabbath fired vocalist Ozzy Osbourne in 1979, Butler also briefly left the band to deal with the divorce from his first wife. The 1980 album Heaven and Hell was recorded with bassist Craig Gruber but Butler returned to the band at the last minute and re-recorded the bass parts prior to release. He again left the band in 1984 after touring in support of their 1983 album, Born Again, although he returned months later as the band attempted a comeback with vocalist David Donato.

In 1988, Butler joined the backing band of his former Sabbath bandmate Osbourne to take part in the No Rest for the Wicked World Tour. He rejoined Black Sabbath in 1991 for the reunion of the Mob Rules line-up, but again quit the group after the Cross Purposes tour in 1994.

In 1995 Butler again joined Osbourne's band to perform on the Ozzmosis album. After recording Ozzmosis, he formed G/Z/R, issuing Plastic Planet in 1995. His next solo album, Black Science, followed in 1997. Butler returned to Sabbath once more for the 1997 edition of Ozzfest, and has remained with the band since. In 2005 he released Ohmwork, his third solo album. In October 2006 it was announced that Butler, along with Tony Iommi, would be reforming the Dehumanizer-era Black Sabbath line-up with Vinny Appice and Ronnie James Dio, under the name Heaven & Hell to differentiate between the reunited touring band fronted by Osbourne, and the Dio-fronted version of the band.

He rejoined Iommi and Osbourne to record 13 and toured in support of the album, which reached its conclusion in 2017.

Style and legacy

Butler is noted for his melodic playing, and as being one of the first bassists to use a wah pedal and to down-tune his instrument (from the standard E-A-D-G to the lower C#-F#-B-E), as exemplified on Black Sabbath's Master of Reality album, to match Iommi who had started tuning his guitar to C# (a minor third down). During the band's Ozzy Osbourne era, Butler wrote most of the band's lyrics, drawing heavily upon his fascination with religion, science-fiction, fantasy and horror, and musings on the darker side of human nature that posed a constant threat of global annihilation.

Butler is regarded as one of the most influential bassists in heavy metal. Billy Sheehan of Mr. Big said: "He's a founding father of a whole genre of music and a man who really set the bar early on to be such an integral part of the sound and song structure of Sabbath". In Mick Wall's biography of Iron Maiden entitled Run to the Hills, founder Steve Harris recalls: "I distinctly remember trying to play along to Black Sabbath's "Paranoid" – at first I just could not get it. I threw the guitar on my bed and walked out in a huff, but the next day I came back, picked it up and played it all the way through note-for-note! Once I got going, I started getting into bass-lines with a bit more subtlety to them...".

Former Metallica bassist Jason Newsted, who defined him his "number 1 influence", stated: "All true metal bassists look up to Geezer as a pioneer and Godfather of our chosen instrument. The best, ever". Rex Brown of Pantera and Kill Devil Hill asserted: "He's a legend. He's everything. Geezer is so much of an influence on me. Other bassists such as Peter Steele, Cliff Burton, Les Claypool, Steve Di Giorgio, Alex Webster, John Myung, Johnny Lee Middleton, Greg Smith cited Butler as a significant influence on their style.

Personal life
Butler is married to Gloria Butler, who managed Heaven & Hell. He was divorced from his first wife in 1980. He also shares his Los Angeles home with several cats, of whom he has posted pictures on his website. His oldest son, Biff Butler, was the frontman in the nu metal band Apartment 26. Butler says Biff is very religious and brings up his children in the Catholic faith. Butler's other son James earned a degree in social sciences from Oxford University and resides in London. Butler describes him as "very politically minded". "My youngest is extremely left-wing, and I think it's because he was brought up knowing wealth and money, whereas I was brought up having no money whatsoever. That's where the church came in and made up for the lack of money because everybody knew each other in the street and everybody used to help each other out", Butler said.

Butler is a lifelong supporter of Aston Villa Football Club, and during Black Sabbath's induction to the Rock and Roll Hall of Fame, Butler is heard shouting "Up the Villa" as the members of the band left the stage. He has referred to football as his "religion" and has stated that Villa legend Peter McParland is his "all-time hero".

According to Osbourne, Butler "never uses foul language". He was raised on a vegetarian diet, largely due to his family being too poor to buy meat on a regular basis, and has been a vegan since approximately 1994. His mother was also a vegetarian.

Butler appeared in a promotional ad for People for the Ethical Treatment of Animals in 2009 and later urged fans to boycott Fortnum & Mason until they remove foie gras from their shelves. Butler said, "I've seen some outrageous things in my time, but watching those poor birds suffer simply so that their diseased livers can be sold on your shop floor is horrific!"

Over the years, Butler has become disillusioned with politics, saying "For me, it's almost pointless voting anymore because it seems to be the same no matter what party or politics you stand for. It all seems corrupted to me. It's all the same old people that rule the world." He has also expressed concern over the increasing level of control government has in people's lives. "Every time I go back to England, there are things that totally surprise me that you never think would happen in England, just all the CCTV everywhere. There seems to be so much control over people these days", he said in 2014.

In January 2015, Butler was briefly detained after a bar brawl in Death Valley, California and charged with misdemeanour assault, public intoxication and vandalism. He was released following detoxification and a citation. In 2016 he opened up about the event: "This guy started mouthing off about something. He was, like, some drunken Nazi bloke. He [...] started going on about Jews and everything - Jews this, Jews that. My missus is Jewish and I'd just had enough, and me hand sort of met his chin. I whacked him one." On the 24th of December 2022 he was diagnosed with pneumonia.

Equipment

Butler currently endorses Lakland basses and has his own signature model. For amplification, Butler is endorsed by Hartke bass amplification, Kilo bass head and 4X10 HyDrive cabinet. In the past, he has been known to use Ampeg SVT and B-15 bass amps, and Fender, Dan Armstrong Plexi, Rickenbacker, Yamaha BB, Vigier and B.C. Rich Basses.

According to the Geezer Butler Bass Rig Rundown, he used the following over the years.
 Pre-CBS Fender Precision (x2)
 Ampeg Dan Armstrong Plexiglass
 John Birch (JB1 body style) in white  (customised with a sticker in the style of a Coca Cola label but says "enjoy cocaine.")
 John Birch (JB1 body style) in black
 John Birch (JB1 body style) 8 string
 Jaydee Roadie 2 (created by John Diggins)
 BC Rich Eagle Deluxe
 BC Rich Iron Bird
 Spector NS-2 (in white)
 Vigier Passion 5
 Vigier Arpege
 Vigier Excess
 Bill Nash custom precision (recording 13)

Lakland basses 

From early 2000s
 Joe Osborn 44-60 (now called a Vintage Jazz) 
 In Seafoam green
 In Black with tortoise pickguard 
 In Black with grey pickguard (Virgin Mary and Henry sticker)
 Joe Osborn 55-60 (5 string Jazz bass)
 Bob Glaub 44-62 Precision Jazz 
 In black with tortoise pickguard
 In black with grey pickguard
 In shoreline gold with grey pickguard (seen on Classic Albums: Black Sabbath)
 44-51 Precision with (Vintage Single Coil pickup) Black with White pick guard as well as 3 small "Henry" stickers.
 44-51M Precision with a Split Coil, White with Black pick guard and a GZR sticker in the bridge
 44-64 Duck Dunn (Vintage P with J style Neck) Singe Precision (Gold sparkle with white pick guard. Jazz bass neck with pearloid block inlays.
 Custom Lakland 51 style Precision in with the emblem of Aston Villa (Seen during "Paranoid" on The End of The End DVD)

Signature Lakland basses 

Released in 2013
 Signature #1 Black with black and grey  aluminium striped pickguard. Custom fret board inlays
 Signature #2 Black with black and grey  aluminium striped pickguard. Plain headstock, Henry sticker on 5th fret, rose gold inlays
 Signature #3 Black with white pickguard, rose gold inlays. All black head stock.

Discography

Black Sabbath
 1970: Black Sabbath
 1970: Paranoid
 1971: Master of Reality
 1972: Vol. 4
 1973: Sabbath Bloody Sabbath
 1975: Sabotage
 1976: Technical Ecstasy
 1978: Never Say Die!
 1980: Heaven and Hell
 1981: Mob Rules
 1982: Live Evil
 1983: Born Again
 1992: Dehumanizer
 1994: Cross Purposes
 1995: Cross Purposes Live
 1998: Reunion
 2007: Black Sabbath: The Dio Years
 2013: 13
 2016: The End

Solo
 1995: Plastic Planet (as "g//z/r")
 1997: Black Science (as "geezer")
 2005: Ohmwork (as "GZR")

Ozzy Osbourne
 1990: Just Say Ozzy
 1993: Live & Loud ("Black Sabbath")
 1995: Ozzmosis
 1997: The Ozzman Cometh ("Back on Earth")

Heaven & Hell
 2007: Live from Radio City Music Hall
 2009: The Devil You Know
 2010: Neon Nights: 30 Years of Heaven & Hell

Non-album singles
 2018: "Down in Flames" (with Deadland Ritual)
 2019: "Broken and Bruised" (with Deadland Ritual)

Other appearances
 1989: Stairway to Heaven/Highway to Hell (with Ozzy Osbourne)
 1994: Nativity in Black (with Bullring Brummies)
 2013: Device (guest appearance on the song "Out of Line")
 2022: I'll Get Through It (with Apocalyptica and Franky Perez)

References

External links

 

1949 births
Living people
20th-century Roman Catholics
21st-century Roman Catholics
Black Sabbath members
English heavy metal bass guitarists
English pacifists
English people of Irish descent
English rock bass guitarists
English Roman Catholics
GZR members
Heaven & Hell (band) members
Male bass guitarists
Musicians from Birmingham, West Midlands
The Ozzy Osbourne Band members
Blues rock musicians